The  Bloomington Extreme season was the team's fifth season as a professional indoor football franchise and second in the Indoor Football League (IFL). One of twenty-five teams competing in the IFL for the 2010 season, the Bloomington, Illinois-based Bloomington Extreme were members of the Central North Division of the United Conference.

Under the leadership of owner Ed Brady, and head coach Kenton Carr, the team played their home games at the U.S. Cellular Coliseum in Bloomington, Illinois.

Schedule

Regular season

Playoffs

Roster

Standings

References

Bloomington Extreme
Bloomington Edge seasons
2010 in sports in Illinois